The R883 road is a regional road in Ireland, located in Mallow in County Cork.

See also 
 Roads in Ireland
 National secondary road

References 

Regional roads in the Republic of Ireland
Roads in County Cork